Depot Road Zhen Shan Mei Claypot Laksa is a street food stall in the Alexandra Village Food Centre in Alexandra Village, Singapore. The food stall was awarded the Michelin Bib Gourmand in 2016.

History
Originally located along Depot Road, the stall was founded by the aunt of the stall's current owner Zhang Ji Lin. However, she was forced to relocate to Alexandra Village Food Centre, and Ji Lin took over the stall from her, due to her deteriorating health.

Reception
The stall was one of 37 stalls in Singapore to be awarded the Michelin Bib Gourmand Award in 2016. It has maintained its position in the Michelin Bib Gourmand. Bryan Choo of TheSmartLocal gave the stall a positive review, stating that he believed this was the best Laksa place in Singapore. Time Out included the stall in its list of the nine best Laksa in Singapore.

References

Street food
Restaurants in Singapore